Puccinellia hauptiana is a species of flowering plant belonging to the family Poaceae.

Its native range is Eastern Europe to Korea, Alaska.

References

hauptiana